The Surdulica massacre was the mass murder of Serbian men by Bulgarian occupational authorities in the southern Serbian town of Surdulica in 1916 and early 1917, during World War I. Members of the Serbian intelligentsia in the region, mostly functionaries, teachers, priests and former soldiers, were detained by Bulgarian forces—ostensibly so that they could be deported to the Bulgarian capital, Sofia—before being taken into the forests around Surdulica and killed. An estimated 2,000–3,000 Serbian men were executed by the Bulgarians in the town and its surroundings. Witnesses to the massacre were interviewed by American writer William A. Drayton in December 1918 and January 1919.

Background
Austria-Hungary declared war on Serbia on 28 July, marking the beginning of World War I. Serbia was invaded by a combined German and Austro-Hungarian force on 7 October 1915. On 14 October, the Kingdom of Bulgaria declared war on Serbia and invaded the country from the east. The Serbian Army was forced to retreat through Albania. Serbia was divided between the Austro-Hungarians, Germans and Bulgarians. The Bulgarian occupation zone was located in the area between the cities of Skopje and Niš, which had been a target of Bulgarian nationalism.

As Bulgarians emphasize, before 1878, that area was under the jurisdiction of the Bulgarian Exarchate and had certain Bulgarophile intelligentsia, but afterwards it was ceded to Serbia and pro-Serbian sentiments became prevailing ubiquitously. A policy of Bulgarianisation targeting ethnic Serbs was implemented there. As result in September 1916, the Serbian high command sent Kosta Pećanac in the Toplica District to organize a guerrilla uprising.

There, Pećanac contacted several groups and joined forces with local leaders. As a consequence, one of the first measures undertaken by the Bulgarian military authorities was the mass-deportation of non-Bulgarian adult males. On 16 December 1916, the Bulgarian military governor of the occupied Serbian territories ordered that "all men between 18 and 50 who have served in the Serbian Army, all officers, former teachers, priests, journalists, former deputies, military functionaries, and all suspected persons, should be arrested and interned". Arrests of Serbian men followed.

In January–February 1917 the Bulgarians began conscripting local Serbs for military service and a rumor was spread that the Allies had reached Skopje, so the Serbs should rise in revolt. The decision for this rebellion was taken and on 21 February, and the Toplica rebellion broke out. Its leaders gathered several hundreds of rebels who conquered Prokuplje and Kuršumlija. Pećanac also attempted to attract Albanians on his side, but without success. On 12 March, the Bulgarian counterattack started under the command of Alexander Protogerov involving  comitadjis' forces of the Internal Macedonian Revolutionary Organisation.

After several days of fighting, the Bulgarians entered Prokuplje on 14 March and Austro-Hungarians the Kuršumlija. As of 25 March, the order there was fully restored. In the battles, several thousand people were killed, including civilians. In April 1917, the Serbian guerrillas attacked a railway station and on 15 May, Pecanac entered the old Bulgarian border and invaded Bosilegrad, which was burned down. Then he withdrew to Kosovo, controlled then by the Austro-Hungarians.

Massacre
By these circumstances many Serbian men in the occupied territories were detained by Bulgarian patrolmen, ostensibly to be taken to the Bulgarian capital, Sofia. Instead, they were taken into the forests surrounding the town of Surdulica and killed, as historian Andrej Mitrović describes it, "using the most brutal methods". Colonel von Lustig, an Austro-Hungarian liaison attached to the German 11th Army, reported:

An estimated 2,000–3,000 Serbian men were executed by the Bulgarians only in Surdulica and its surroundings. At the same time the Bulgarian military authorities killed also many civilians in Vranje, Zajecar, Kacanik, and other places in that area. The Bulgarian head of the Vranje district described the executed men as "killers, thieves and butchers" whose "[crimes] were so great that at least ten years would be needed to mend their evil".

Gallery

Aftermath
The relatives of those executed in and around Surdulica were harassed and persecuted by Bulgarian authorities following the massacre. An American writer named William A. Drayton visited Macedonia and southern Serbia between December 1918 and January 1919 as part of a Serbian commission investigating Bulgarian war crimes in these regions. Drayton noted in his diary that he interviewed fifteen eyewitnesses who charged that Bulgarian forces deported Serbs to Surdulica and executed a portion of them there in accordance with pre-determined lists of names. The rest, according to the witnesses, actually were deported to Sofia.

See also

 Štip massacre

Notes

References

 
 
 
 
 

1916 in Serbia
1917 in Serbia
Bulgarian occupation of Serbia during World War I
Massacres in Serbia
Mass murder in 1916
Mass murder in 1917
Massacres in 1916
Massacres of men
Massacres of Serbs
World War I massacres
1917 murders in Europe
1916 murders in Europe
Violence against men in Europe
World War I crimes by the Kingdom of Bulgaria
Massacres in 1917